Kenai Central High School (KCHS) is a public high school serving grades 9–12 in Kenai, Alaska. The school operates under the authority of the Kenai Peninsula Borough School District, and is one of five high schools in the district. The School's mascot is the Kardinal, and its colors are red, white and black. The current principal is Dan Beck, and its assistant principal is Will Chervenak.

Notable alumni
 Allie Ostrander, professional runner
 Kelly Wolf, Alaska state representative

References

Public high schools in Alaska
Schools in Kenai Peninsula Borough, Alaska